Freedom of religion in Sri Lanka is a protected right under Chapter II, Article 9 of the constitution of Sri Lanka. This applies to all religions, though Buddhism is given the foremost place under the 1978 Republican Constitution. Sri Lanka is regarded by its Supreme Court as being a secular state.

Limitations on proselytism were outlined by the Supreme Court of Sri Lanka in 2018, with the ruling against a Catholic organisation stating that the provision of economic and financial support to vulnerable individuals while promulgating a faith was an infringement upon those individuals' right to freedom of religion.

Constitution
Article 9 of the constitution states: "The Republic of Sri Lanka shall give to Buddhism the foremost place and accordingly it shall be the duty of the State to protect and foster the Buddha Sasana while assuring to all religions the rights granted by Articles 10 and 14(1)(e)."

Articles 10 and 14(1)(e) state: "Every person is entitled to freedom of thought, conscience and religion, including the freedom to have or to adopt a religion or belief of his choice." and "Every citizen is entitled to the freedom, either by himself or in association with others, and either in public or in private, to manifest his religion or belief in worship, observance, practice or teaching."

Governance
Matters related to family law, e.g., divorce, child custody and inheritance are adjudicated under the customary law of the applicable ethnic or religious group.  For example, the minimum age of marriage for women is 18 years, except in the case of Muslims, who continued to follow their customary religious practices of girls attaining marrying age with the onset of puberty and men when they are financially capable of supporting a family.

In 2014, the government established a special religious police unit to deal with religious complaints. The new unit reports to the Ministry of Law and Order, although it is housed in the Buddhist Division of the Ministry of Buddhist Sasana and Religious Affairs. Critics argue that it will bolster and strengthen the violent Buddhist nationalist groups such as Bodu Bala Sena(BBS) 

Foreign clergy may work in the country, but for the last three decades, the government has limited the issuance of temporary work permits. Work permits for foreign clergy are issued for one year (rather than five years as in the past). It is possible to obtain extensions of work permits.

Inter-religious relations
The practice of Hinduism was allowed under Sinhalese kings since the Anuradhapura era. Buddhist Sinhalese kings gave protection to Muslims fleeing from Portuguese persecution and to Catholics fleeing from persecution by the Dutch after having been defeated by the Portuguese.

This coexistence has been marred by isolated incidents and attacks on religious places by Islamic extremist groups, Hindu extremist groups and a Buddhist extremist group. Several Hindu temples were attacked in the riots of 1983 in Colombo and South of Sri Lanka. While not acting on religious beliefs, the Sri Lankan air force air raided Hindu and Christian shrines during the Sri Lankan Civil War, with the belief that LTTE rebels had taken shelter there, with the Navaly church bombing being one notable controversial event. Two of the holiest sites for Buddhists in Sri Lanka, the Sri Maha Bodhi Tree and the Temple of the Tooth, were attacked and bombed by the secularist LTTE. The LTTE also attacked several Muslim mosques in the North-Eastern parts of the country.

At times, some local police and government officials have appeared to be acting in concert with Buddhist nationalist organizations. In 2013, several non-governmental organisations alleged that government officials provided assistance, or at least tacitly supported the actions of societal groups targeting religious minorities.

References

Religion in Sri Lanka
Sri Lanka
Human rights in Sri Lanka